Shas or SHAS may refer to:
Shas, Israeli political party
Shisha Sedarim, the Six Orders of Mishnah and Talmud
Vilna Edition Shas
Šas, village in Montenegro
Sacred Heart Apostolic School
Mohd Fadhli Mohd Shas, footballer